The 1844 Christchurch by-election was a parliamentary by-election for the House of Commons constituency of Christchurch, Hampshire held on 28 March 1844. It was won by Conservative Edward Harris.

Results

References 

1844 in England
1844 elections in the United Kingdom
Politics of Christchurch, Dorset
By-elections to the Parliament of the United Kingdom in Hampshire constituencies
19th century in Hampshire